Albertus Theodore Briggs (March 3, 1862 – September 12, 1937) was a Methodist Episcopal minister for more than 40 years, and a District Superintendent in the Hammond and Greencastle districts in Indiana. For years, he was the President of the Preachers Aid Society, now the United Methodist Foundation of Indiana.

Early life and education
He was the second of six children, born in Findlay, Ohio, to William Henry Harrison Briggs and Catherine (Harmel) Briggs. William was raised as a farmer, but became a carpenter and contractor, serving as an important member of his community. He served in the Union Army during the Civil War.
His father was Andrew Briggs, a merchant in Rockville, Ohio and a farmer in Hancock County, Ohio. William's grandfather, John Briggs, served in the Revolution and the War of 1812.

A.T. Briggs attended the Fort Wayne Methodist College and in 1890 graduated from DePauw University, located in Greencastle, Indiana. At DePauw, he was a member of the Beta Theta Pi fraternity and one of the four charter members of the DePauw chapter of Phi Beta Kappa. He earned an A.M. in 1893, a D.D. in 1910.

Career
He joined the Northwest Indiana Conference of the Methodist Episcopal Church in 1889. He served churches in this conference for 40 years.

He was a student pastor at Simpson M.E. Church in Fort Wayne, Indiana while affiliated with the Fort Wayne College. He was also a student pastor at Carpentersville, Indiana and Knightsville, Indiana while attending DePauw.
Briggs was associate pastor at Centenary Church, Terre Haute, Indiana, from 1892 to 1894. During this time, he is credited with being the founder of the Maple Avenue Church in Terre Haute. 
He was pastor at Grace Church, Rochester, Indiana, from 1894 to 1896; Kentland, Monticello, Attica, Indiana and LaPorte, Indiana.

He then served as Superintendent for the Hammond District from 1908 to 1914, living in Valparaiso, Indiana. He served at the West Lafayette Methodist Episcopal Church from 1914 to 1916.

He was Superintendent of the Greencastle District from 1925 to 1931. He retired in 1931 to give more younger ministers the chance to serve. 
He still served part-time where needed, including at the Gobin Memorial Church in Greencastle, Indiana. 

Briggs was President of the Preachers Aid Society for 12 or 14 years and was active in the Battle Ground Camp Meetings of the Northwest Indiana Conference. He was a General Delegate to the 1912 General Conference in Minneapolis.

Personal life
Briggs met Lenore Alleman while they were in school at the Fort Wayne Methodist Academy. They both attended Depauw and married on June 14, 1890. She was born in 1867 in Argos, Indiana, the daughter of Jacob C. Alleman and Mary Ann Lowry. Her great grandfather, John Alleman was from Pennsylvania and served in the Revolution. She earned a Ph B. and an A.M. from DePauw University where she was a member of the Kappa Alpha Theta sorority and treasurer of the Y.M.C.A. She served as a high school principal at Waterloo High School (Ohio) in Atwater, Ohio in 1891 and at Celina High School in Celina, Ohio in 1892. 
They had five daughters; Genevieve, Margaret, Mildred, Ruth Lenore, and Mary Elizabeth Briggs, all of whom went to college.

He died at the Methodist Hospital in Indianapolis, and his funeral was held at the Gobin Memorial Church in Greencastle.
Briggs and his wife are buried in the Forest Hill Cemetery in Greencastle.

Genealogy
 Albertus Theodore Briggs, son of
 William H. H. Briggs (1836–1909), son of
 Andrew Briggs (1786–1863), son of
 John Briggs (1736–1802)

See also

 List of DePauw University alumni
 List of people from Indiana
 List of people from Ohio

References

Place of death missing
1862 births
1937 deaths
19th-century American people
19th-century Methodist ministers
20th-century American people
20th-century Methodist ministers
American Methodist clergy
Beta Theta Pi
Burials in Indiana
DePauw University alumni
People from Attica, Indiana
People from Greencastle, Indiana
People from Kentland, Indiana
People from Monticello, Indiana
People from Findlay, Ohio
People from Richmond, Indiana
People from Rochester, Indiana
People from Terre Haute, Indiana
People from Valparaiso, Indiana
20th-century American clergy
19th-century American clergy